Sheleg Ba'sharav (Hebrew: שלג בשרב, meaning "Snow in the Heat Wave") is the third studio album by Israeli singer Shiri Maimon, released on August 30, 2012.

Track listing
 "Sheleg BaSharav" (Snow in the Heatwave) - 3:31
 "Mekhaka SheTashuv" (Waiting for You to Come Back) — 3:14
 "Kama At Yafa" (How Beautiful You Are) — 4:04
 "Ga'agua" (Longing) — 3:26
 "'Ulay Ani Bekha" (Maybe I'm in You) — 3:19
 "Dilemma" - 3:24
 "Lizroq Zahav" (Throwing Gold Away) — 3:15
 "LaYsha SheHayta" (To the Woman That Was) — 4:06
 "Esha'er Otkha Lesaper" (I Will Remain, to Tell About You) — 3:12
 "BeSoff Yom" (At The End of a Day) — 3:08

2012 albums
Shiri Maimon albums